Syncopacma vinella, the Brighton sober, is a moth of the family Gelechiidae. It was described by Bankes in 1898. It is found in Europe, where it has been recorded from Denmark to Hungary, and from Great Britain to Slovakia.

The wingspan is 10.5–12 mm. The forewings are rather glossy fuscous-black, tinged with violet and minutely speckled with pale scales. The hindwings are satiny-grey.

The larvae feed on Genista tinctoria, Medicago falcata, Medicago sativa and Trifolium pratense. They mine the leaves of their host plant. They spin a number of leaflets together and bite a hole in the epidermis of the basal part of a leaflet and mine it out almost completely. The colour of the body varies from dull white to almost black, with a brown head.

References

Moths described in 1898
Syncopacma